Chothe (Chawte, Kyao) is a Kuki-Chin language of northeastern India. It may be intelligible with Aimol.

Geographical distribution
Chothe is spoken in the following locations (Ethnologue). The "purest" Chothe is reported to be spoken in Purum Khullen (Ethnologue).

Southeastern Manipur
Chandel district (in 15 villages)
Bishnupur district (in Lamlang Hupi village)
Nagaland (near the Myanmar border)

References

Southern Naga languages
Languages of Manipur
Languages of Nagaland